The flag of Barbados was designed by Grantley W. Prescod and was officially adopted to represent the nation of Barbados at midnight on 30 November 1966, the day the country gained independence. The flag was chosen as part of a nationwide open contest held by the government, with Prescod's design being selected as the winner of a field of over one thousand entries. The flag is a triband design, with the outermost stripes coloured ultramarine, to represent the sea and the sky, and the middle stripe coloured gold, to represent the sand. Within the middle band is displayed the head of a trident. This trident is meant to represent the trident of Poseidon, visible in Barbados's colonial coat of arms, and the fact that it is broken is meant to represent the breaking of colonial rule in Barbados and independence from the British Empire.

After Prescod's design was selected as the winner of the contest, he was asked to make several flags as a personal request from Errol Barrow, the nation's first prime minister. Prescod constructed seven flags out of fabrics purchased from a department store. The flag was raised for the first time in a ceremony by Lieutenant Hartley Dottin of the Barbados Regiment. From its independence in 1966, Barbados also had a royal standard for Queen Elizabeth II and a standard for the governor-general, though these flags were retired in 2021 after Barbados officially became a republic. In their place, the use of a presidential standard began in 2021.

History
After some time as a British colony, Barbados became part of the British Windward Islands in 1833, with the Union Jack as its official flag. It was reestablished as the colony of Barbados in 1885 and remained that way until 1958; during this time, the flag of the colony consisted of a Blue Ensign which was defaced with the colonial seal. From 1958 to 1962, Barbados was under the control of the West Indies Federation, who used the so-called "Sun and Seas Flag", consisting of a circular orange "sun" atop a blue field with four wavy white lines. After control was retaken by the United Kingdom from 1962 to 1966, following the dissolution of the West Indies Federation, the Barbadian legislature made their case for independence. Barbados became an independent nation on 30 November 1966. At midnight on that day, the modern-day flag came into effect as the first official flag of an independent Barbados and was raised for the first time in a ceremony by Lieutenant Hartley Dottin, a member of the Barbados Regiment.

The design of the flag was created by Grantley W. Prescod, an art teacher, and was chosen as the winner of an open competition arranged by the Barbados government and judged by seven individuals. Over one thousand entries were received, with the exact number being 1,029. He was awarded a $500 cash prize, which was donated to a popular newspaper publishing company, a scroll from the Barbadian government, and a gold medal. In addition to designing the flag, Prescod also constructed the first physical flag, at the request of Prime Minister Errol Barrow. After choosing fabrics of the right colors at a department store, Prescod made "approximately seven flags".

Design

The flag consists of a triband of two bands of ultramarine, which are said to stand for the ocean surrounding the country and the sky, though some sources attribute both blue stripes to be representing the ocean. The blue stripes are separated by a golden middle band, which represents the sand. A black trident head, commonly called the broken trident, is centred in the golden band, and the fact that the staff is missing is significant. The trident symbol was taken from Barbados' colonial badge, where the trident of Poseidon is shown with Britannia holding it. The broken lower part symbolises a symbolic break from its status as a colony. The three points of the trident represent the three principles of democracy: government of the people, government for the people, and government by the people.

The official British Standard colour code numbers for the flag are:
Ultramarine — BCC 148, Gold — BS O/002.

Historical and variant flags
From its independence in 1966, Barbados had standards for Queen Elizabeth II, as well as the governor-general and prime minister. The first of these consisted of a yellow field with a blue circular disk containing the letter "E" and a crown in the centre, surrounded by gold roses; this device is displayed on Elizabeth II's personal flag. This logo is placed atop a giant bearded fig (Ficus citrifolia), and a pride of Barbados flower (Caesalpinia pulcherrima) is displayed in each upper corner. This flag was used only when the Queen was visiting the nation or representing them abroad as their head of state. The standard of the governor-general is a navy blue field with St Edward's Crown in the centre; atop the crown sits a lion which is itself crowned, and below the crown is displayed a banner which reads "BARBADOS". Both of these flags were retired when Barbados gained full independence and ceased to be a Commonwealth realm, instead becoming a republic effective 30 November 2021.

The standard of the prime minister consists of the coat of arms within a white circle at the flag's centre. From the upper-left to the lower-right of the flag runs a black- and white-striped rope, which fimbriates the white circle and the line dividing the portion of the field coloured blue and the portion of the field coloured yellow. This flag was introduced with the first prime minister in 1966 and is still in use. The standard of the president is noticeably simpler; it consists only of a dark navy field with the coat of arms in the centre, surrounded by a wreath of gold flowers. Just below the arms is a small version of the "broken trident" symbol, coloured gold.

The Barbadian naval ensign follows much the same pattern as that of the United Kingdom, the White Ensign; rather than a Union Jack, the canton is occupied by the national flag of Barbados. The Barbados Defence Force, the nation's combined armed forces, has its own flag as well, consisting of the organisation's logo atop a green field.

Colors

See also

National symbols of Barbados
List of Barbadian flags

References

External links

 
National flags
Flag
Flags adopted through competition
Flags introduced in 1966
Poseidon